Innovation Park is the location of the National High Magnetic Field Laboratory, the Applied Superconductivity Center, Danfoss Turbocor and related advanced research facilities.  The Leon County Research and Development Authority's Innovation Park is located near the campuses of Florida State University, Florida A&M University and Tallahassee Community College in Tallahassee, Florida.

Innovation Park is located slightly southwest of downtown Tallahassee.

The Park 
Innovation Park was created in 1978 and is overseen by the Leon County Research and Development Authority (The Authority) The Authority is governed by a Board of Governors composed of prominent academic, business and community leaders who work together to facilitate growth and development of research into high-tech businesses in Innovation Park.  There are currently 1900 jobs in Innovation Park.

Sitting on 208 acres of scenic woods, Innovation Park features 17 buildings; 9 of which are owned by Florida State University, 1 is owned by Florida A&M University and The Authority owns 5. The other buildings are privately owned. The research park also includes the Florida A&M University Small business development center, which assists entrepreneurs from the beginning stages of the growth of their dream. From evaluating business ideas, to developing a business plan, to exploring financing options, the Small Business development center is a wise strategic partner, from step one, all the way up the ladder of success.
Innovation Park sits next to the FAMU-FSU College of Engineering. However, no classrooms are permitted on Innovation Park property. The park currently has 7.3 acres of undeveloped land that can be leased for development.

The Research Park is located in Leon County, where there are several business incentives being offered, as well as grants and scholarships.

Partnerships 
The Leon County Research and Development Authority works in partnership with Florida State University, Florida A&M University, Tallahassee Community College, as well as governmental and industrial sector representatives.

Notable Tenants 
 National High Magnetic Field Laboratory
 FSU Center for Advanced Power Systems (CAPS)
 FSU Center for Ocean-Atmospheric Prediction Studies (COAPS)
 Aeropropulsion Mechatronics and Energy Center (AME)
 High Performance Materials  Institute (HPMI)
 FAMU Center for Plasma Science and Technology
 Danfoss Turbocor Compressors
 Florida Virtual Campus
 FSU Enterprise Resource Planning
 National Park Service Southeast Archaeological Center
 Florida Department of Transportation Structural Research Center 
 Small Business Development Center at FAMU

References

External links
 Official website

Science parks in the United States
Buildings and structures in Tallahassee, Florida